Kalvari-class submarines were the first submarines inducted into the Indian Navy. They were variants of the early Soviet s. Four of the class served in the Indian Navy.

 has been preserved as a museum on Ramakrishna Mission Beach in Visakhapatnam. The sail of the lead vessel,  is also on display at the Visakhapatnam city museum.

Ships

References

 
Submarine classes
India–Soviet Union relations